Paul Lokiru Kalanda (27 February 1927 – 19 August 2015) was a Catholic priest who served as Bishop of the Diocese of Moroto from 1980 until 1991 and as Bishop of the Roman Catholic Diocese of Fort Portal from 1991 until 2003.

Background and priesthood
Kalanda was born on 27 February 1927 at Buwunde Village, Kyannamukaaka sub-county, in present-day Masaka District, in the Buganda Region of Uganda. He was ordained priest on 21 December 1957. He served as  priest in the Roman Catholic Diocese of Masaka until 29 November 1980, when he was appointed bishop.

As bishop
He was appointed Bishop of the Roman Catholic Diocese of Moroto, in Uganda, on 29 November 1980. He was consecrated bishop on 22 March 1981, by Cardinal Emmanuel Kiwanuka Nsubuga†, Archbishop of Kampala, assisted by Bishop Adrian Kivumbi Ddungu†, Bishop of Masaka and Bishop Sisto Mazzoldi†, Apostolic Vicar of Bahr el-Gebel.

On 17 June 1991, Kalanda was appointed Bishop of the Roman Catholic Diocese of Fort Portal, serving in that capacity until he retired on 18 March 2003. He died on 19 August 2015, as Bishop Emeritus of Fort Portal, Uganda, at the age of 88 years and 5 months.

References

External links
 Profile of the Diocese of Fort Portal

1927 births
2015 deaths
20th-century Roman Catholic bishops in Uganda
21st-century Roman Catholic bishops in Uganda
People from Masaka District
Roman Catholic bishops of Moroto
Roman Catholic bishops of Fort Portal